, also known as Far East of Eden: Ziria, is a 1989 role-playing video game, which published by Hudson Soft on PC Engine CD-ROM². It is the first game in the Tengai Makyo (Far East of Eden) series, and follows a plot based on the legend of Jiraiya. The game was popular in Japan because its release on the CD-ROM format, which made it a large game for its time filled with voiced cutscenes and CD audio music.

Reception 
The game received a positive review from PC Engine Fan magazine, which rated it 25.67 out of 30.

Retrospectively, Kurt Kalata of Hardcore Gaming 101 said the game was popular in Japan because "it was the first game of its kind on CD." He noted that, breaking "free of the memory constraints of cartridges, Tengai Makyō was able to deliver" an "even bigger" game "filled with animated, fully voiced cutscenes and CD music" and that "back in 1989, when the Famicom was still at the height of its populaity, characters that could talk were a really big deal."

Ports and remakes 
The game was re-released for Japanese cellphones in the 2000s. 

An Xbox 360 remake  was released in 2006. Gaijinworks was working on an English localization of the remake at some point, but had to cancel the project due to being unable to get past Microsoft's publishing minimums.

References

External links 

 official website (archived)  
 

1989 video games
Hudson Soft games
Japan-exclusive video games
Japanese role-playing video games
Mobile games
Video games about ninja
PlayStation Network games
Single-player video games
TurboGrafx-CD games
Video game remakes
Video games developed in Japan
Video games featuring female protagonists
Xbox 360 games
1 Ziria
Video games scored by Ryuichi Sakamoto